Dallas Open (tennis), may refer to:
 Dallas Open (1983), a defunct tennis tournament held only in 1983.
 Dallas Open (2022), a current tennis tournament held since 2022.

See also